may refer to:
JR Kobe Line, an alias of, and a part of the Tōkaidō Main Line and Sanyō Main Line (Ōsaka-Himeji)
Hankyu Kobe Line (Umeda-Sannomiya)
Hanshin Expressway Route 3 (Kobe Route)